Michel Bernard (31 December 1931 – 14 February 2019) was a French middle- and long-distance runner. He competed at the 1960 and 1964 Olympics in the 1500 m and 5000 m and finished in seventh place in all events. During his career he won nine national titles, in the 1500 m (1955 and 1959), 5000 m (1958–1960 and 1962) and 10000 m (1961, 1964 and 1965). Between 1985 and 1987 he was president of the Fédération française d'athlétisme.

Biography
Bernard was born to Pierre Bernard, a blacksmith; his mother ran a hardware shop. His father died on the front in World War II, and his mother raised him alone, together with his younger sister.

At sixteen, Bernard started working at a factory. Next year he became involved with running, and in 1949 and 1950 became junior champion of France. He lost his form during 18 months of the military service, but had recovered it by 1954. In 1955, he won his first senior national title and was selected for the national team, but not for the 1956 Olympics. Nationally, Bernard was losing to Michel Jazy, who was a stronger runner and had better conditions for training, whereas Bernard had to take unpaid leaves from work to prepare for major competitions.

In 1960, Bernard met Chantal Churn, also a track athlete. They married on 27 November 1961 and later had a son, Pierre-Michel (born in 1963), and daughters Sandrine (born 1964) and Cathy (born 1965).

After retiring from competitions Bernard became involved with the national athletics federation, serving as its president between 1985 and 1987. He also became interested in local politics, and founded in 2001 the association Anzin pour tous.

Personal bests
1500 m – 3:38.7 (1963) 
5000 m – 13:40.0 (1971)

References

Bibliography

1931 births
2019 deaths
Athletes (track and field) at the 1960 Summer Olympics
Athletes (track and field) at the 1964 Summer Olympics
Olympic athletes of France
French male middle-distance runners